Pistyll is a village and community in the Welsh county of Gwynedd, located on the Llŷn Peninsula midway between Nefyn and Llanaelhaearn. The Larger village of Llithfaen, and had a population of 1,113 according to the 2021 Census. The actor Rupert Davies, best known for playing the title character in Maigret, retired to the village and is buried here.

The sixth century church, St. Bueno's, was used by mediaeval pilgrims travelling to Bardsey Island.

References